The men's long jump event was part of the track and field athletics programme at the 1948 Summer Olympics. The competition was held on July 31, 1948. Twenty-one athletes from 17 nations competed. The maximum number of athletes per nation had been set at 3 since the 1930 Olympic Congress. The final was won by American Willie Steele. It was the United States' fifth consecutive and tenth overall gold medal in the men's long jump. Theo Bruce won Australia's first long jump medal with his silver.

Background

This was the 11th appearance of the event, which is one of 12 athletics events to have been held at every Summer Olympics. None of the jumpers from the pre-war 1936 Games returned. Willie Steele was the favorite; he had won the 1946 and 1947 AAU championships as well as the 1948 U.S. Olympic trials (nearly breaking Jesse Owens's world record, fouling on his would-be record jump). However, Steele came into London with an injured ankle.

Ceylon, Guyana, Iceland, South Korea, and Portugal each made their first appearance in the event. The United States appeared for the 11th time, the only nation to have long jumpers at each of the Games thus far.

Competition format

The 1948 competition used a two-round format that took aspects from both the pre-1936 formats and the unusual three-round 1936 tournament. The qualifying round gave each competitor three jumps to achieve a distance of 7.20 metres; if fewer than 12 men did so, the top 12 (including all those tied) would advance. The final provided each jumper with six jumps, with the best to count (qualifying round jumps were not considered for the final).

Records

Prior to the competition, the existing World and Olympic records were as follows.

No new world or Olympic records were set during the competition.

Schedule

All times are British Summer Time (UTC+1)

Results

Qualifying

Qual. rule: qualification standard 7.20m (Q) or at least best 12 qualified (q).

Final

Results of individual jumps are not known other than for Steele. Steele's first jump was 7.825 metres and his second 7.680 metres; he did not take any further jumps. Steele's result was the best non-wind-assisted jump in Olympic history.

References

Athletics at the 1948 Summer Olympics
Long jump at the Olympics
Men's events at the 1948 Summer Olympics